Arthur Uranus Gerber (1878–1960) was a commercial architect who resided in Evanston, Illinois and whose designs included a number of transit stations in the Chicago metropolitan area, at least five of which have since been placed onto the National Register of Historic Places.  He was employed by the Northwestern Elevated originally then moved onto to design other buildings for its successor, the Chicago Rapid Transit, and the interurban railroads the Chicago North Shore & Milwaukee, the Chicago South Shore & South Bend, and the Chicago Aurora & Elgin as each came under the control of utilities tycoon Samuel Insull.

Styles 
Gerber was an eclectic architect who worked in several major styles: Craftsman, Bungaloid, Prairie, Beaux Arts, Spanish Colonial aka "Insull Spanish, " and Moderne.  Not all of his works were of these styles only. The Lake Shore (also known as Pines) and Beverly Shores stations along the South Shore Line were both of the Spanish style, including stucco walls and red tile roofs as is the sole remaining Skokie Valley Route station of the North Shore Line, Briergate, in Highland Park, Illinois. The Kenosha station on 63rd Street and the Dempster station in Skokie, both of which are standing, are a blend of Bungaloid and Prairie styles, somewhat reminiscent of Frank Lloyd Wright style.  The Mundelein North Shore Line station was a twin of the Kenosha station but it was torn down in the 1960s following abandonment of the North Shore Line in 1963.

Famous works 
 Beverly Shores station, South Shore Line
 Lake Shore station, South Shore Line
 Former 11th Street station, South Shore Line
 Original Dempster station, Chicago 'L' and North Shore Line
 Villa Park, CA&E station
 Wilson, Chicago 'L' station
 Linden, Chicago 'L' station
 Kenosha, Wisconsin, North Shore Line station

Remaining works 
Beverly Shores and the Michigan City depots in Indiana are still standing though the City of Michigan City recently bought the station there and plans on saving just the Beaux Arts facade, replacing everything behind it.  In Illinois his stations in Skokie at Dempster, Villa Avenue in Villa Park; in Chicago, Wilson Avenue (Uptown), Sheridan Road, and Howard Street are still standing. Beverly Shores is partially an art gallery, partially a train station. Wilson is still a CTA stop and, as of 2017, is under restoration. The Dempster Street station, following relocation from its original site 130 feet east in 2002, hosts a Starbucks and is across from the contemporary CTA terminal, but it not used for trains. Villa Avenue is used by the Villa Park Historical Society as a museum. Kenosha's station was given a historic facelift and is used as an educational facility.

Gallery

References

External links 
 
 Website devoted to Gerber's works

Architects from Chicago
20th-century American architects
American railway architects
People from Evanston, Illinois
1878 births
1960 deaths